OpenDesktop is:

 an online community for open source content and applications, see openDesktop.org
 the name of an operating system of the Santa Cruz Operation
 the former name of a Linux distribution now called Co-CreateLinux